Middletown is the largest city in Orange County, New York, United States. It lies in New York's Hudson Valley region, near the Wallkill River and the foothills of the Shawangunk Mountains. Middletown is situated between Port Jervis and Newburgh, New York. At the 2020 United States census, the city's population was 30,345, reflecting an increase of 2,259 from the 28,086 counted in the 2010 census. The zip code is 10940. Middletown falls within the Poughkeepsie–Newburgh–Middletown Metropolitan Statistical Area, which belongs to the larger New York–Newark–Bridgeport, NY-NJ-CT-PA Combined Statistical Area.

Middletown was incorporated as a city in 1888. It grew in the 19th and early 20th centuries as a stop on several lower New York State railroads, attracting several small manufacturing businesses. The surrounding area is partly devoted to small dairy farms. Mediacom Communications Corp, the Galleria at Crystal Run, SUNY Orange, Walmart, Touro College of Osteopathic Medicine and the Times Herald-Record are major employers in Middletown.

History

Early history
John Green purchased land from the DeLancey patent and probably settled the area around 1744. Due to its location between other settlements, residents adopted the name of Middletown, changing it later to South Middletown to avoid confusion with a nearby location.  Eventually they dropped the word "south", using the current name when the community became a village in 1848. The village was incorporated as a city in 1888.

The First Congregational Church of Middletown, established in 1785, has the highest spire downtown. Construction of its first building was a sign of Middletown becoming established as a village. Its current church building was constructed in 1872.

Growth of Middletown
Middletown grew through the 19th century, stimulated by construction of the Erie Railroad and the New York, Ontario and Western Railway (among others). The city was industrialized, developing factories for various industries, such as shoes, lawnmower blades, and furniture. These did well through the World War II era.

The Webb Horton mansion and adjoining 18 acres were donated to establish Orange County Community College in 1950.

Due to industrial restructuring, most of the old manufacturing businesses had closed by the 1960s. In 1968, Middletown annexed the adjacent Village of Amchir. In the 1970s, the economy of Middletown and surrounding communities suffered additional blows due to the closing of a large Ford Motor Company plant in Mahwah, New Jersey, and the downsizing of IBM operations in the area.

Responding to higher housing costs in New York City, from the 1970s, New York City police officers, firefighters and other workers began to move to the area, as local housing offered better value. These commuters, who drove two hours each way, helped to bolster the economy of the area. After 1986, however, New York City required its municipal employees to reside in the city, and Middletown lost this source of residential development. The only railroad left in town is the Middletown and New Jersey Railway, a freight line. The population has continued to grow into the 21st century, while the economy has shifted largely to service and retail, with a regional medical center a major employer in the area.

Modern Middletown
The downtown business district of Middletown suffered from suburbanization that drew off retail businesses. The "Miracle Mile" shopping strip and Lloyd's Supermarket were developed in the late 1960s and two later shopping malls, all located at the eastern edge of town along Route 211, near Route 17 and Interstate 84. The Orange Plaza mall drew several of the downtown shops into it by the mid-1970s, weakening downtown. To the East across Route 17, the Galleria at Crystal Run opened in the early 1990s. A Wal-Mart Supercenter replaced the Orange Plaza mall in 2001. Some of the buildings downtown are abandoned or underused. But there has long been an active downtown bar and restaurant scene.

The downtown area has several historic churches. The Middletown City Hall and City Court are located on James Street. Prosperous neighborhoods include Presidential Heights. Highland Avenue is lined with large Victorian houses, some of the largest of which are now used as nursing homes. Other neighborhoods show the effects of loss of jobs and decline in the economy. The surrounding countryside was devoted partly to small dairy farms, but family farming has waned since the 1980s.

Middletown is the main business address for the newspaper Times Herald-Record and its owner, Local Media Group. Mediacom Communications Corp, a cable and other pay TV company, is headquartered outside the city in the Town of Wallkill. It is also a manufacturing location for Bell Flavors & Fragrances.

Places of interest

The downtown area, particularly North and Main streets, has a variety of ethnic eateries and various small boutiques and thrift shops. Several churches are located in the neighborhood. The city has the single-screen, 1,100-seat Paramount Theatre, which also offers stage shows and concerts, a local arts council, a bowling alley, WALL and WOSR radio stations, Thrall Library and the Van Duzer Historical Society museum downtown.

Civic organizations include Boy Scouts of America and Girl Scouts of the USA chapters, as well as Lions Club, Elks Club, Kiwanis and Rotary Club. The Rotary Club runs a Horse Show at Fancher Davidge Park each fall. Middletown is the site of the Orange County Fair each summer and the Orange County Fair Speedway. Highland Lakes State Park is the nearest state park. Good choices for hiking, biking and country drives are nearby.

Shopping in the area includes the Galleria at Crystal Run, a mall just east of Middletown, and a long retail strip along Route 211 on the east side of town.

Middletown's Hillside Cemetery was designed by the British architect and landscape designer Calvert Vaux, who worked with Frederick Law Olmsted to design Central Park in New York City. The J. W. Chorley Elementary School, designed by the American architect Paul Rudolph, was built in the 1960s and demolished in 2013.

Health care
Health care services are provided at Garnet Health Medical Center (formerly Orange Regional Medical Center), a hospital located in the town of Walkill. ORMC was completed in 2011, merging the faculties of the former Horton Medical Center and Arden Hill Hospital. It is a major employer in the region.

Geography

Middletown is located at  (41.4458, -74.4221) in Orange County. The city is nearly surrounded by the town of Wallkill, except for its southernmost section, which is in the town of Wawayanda.

According to the United States Census Bureau, the city has a total area of 5.2 square miles (13.3 km2), of which 5.1 square miles (13.3 km2)  is land and 0.19% is water. The city is drained by Monhagen Brook and the Wallkill River.

Climate

Transportation
Middletown can be reached from New York City by bus and is located near the intersection of Interstate 84 and NY 17 (the future Interstate 86). State routes 17M and 211 run right through the city, and US 6 parallels I-84 to the south.

The Middletown-Town of Wallkill station on Metro-North Railroad's Port Jervis line is located nearby, in the Town of Wallkill, and provides rail service to Port Jervis, other communities in Orange and Rockland Counties and Bergen County, New Jersey, Hoboken and New York City via a transfer at Secaucus, New Jersey.

(ID: 06N)

Middletown has a bus service, Middletown Transit, with four routes that connect at the bus station, located on Railroad Avenue, where passengers can connect to Coach USA and Short Line bus service. There is also a "Main Line" bus connecting to surrounding Orange County villages and another route connecting to areas such as Newburgh and Woodbury.

Demographics

At the 2010 census, the population of Middletown was 28,086. The ethnic make-up was 39.7% Hispanic, 36.6% white (exclusive of Hispanics), 21.0% African-American, 1.9% Asian and 0.8% Native American.

At the 2000 census, there were 25,388 people, 9,466 households and 5,963 families residing in the city. The racial make-up of the city was 68.68% White, 15.13% African American, 0.75% Native American, 1.69% Asian, 0.03% Pacific Islander, 9.33% from other races and 4.40% from two or more races. Hispanic or Latino of any race were 25.11% of the population. 34.0% of households  had children under the age of 18 living with them, 40.0% were married couples living together, 16.7% had a female householder with no husband present, and 37.0% were non-families. 30.0% of all households were made up of individuals, and 12.3% had someone living alone who was 65 years of age or older. The average household size was 2.62 and the average family size was 3.27.

27.8% of the population were under the age of 18, 9.4% from 18 to 24, 31.0% from 25 to 44, 19.9% from 45 to 64 and 12.0% were 65 years of age or older. The median age was 33 years. For every 100 females, there were 93.4 males. For every 100 females age 18 and over, there were 90.1 males. The median household income was $39,570 and the median family income was $47,760. Males had a median income of $35,990 and females $28,429. The per capita income was $18,947. About 13.5% of families and 17.5% of the population were below the poverty line, including 25.4% of those under age 18 and 10.3% of those age 65 or over.

Government
Middletown is governed by a mayor and a city council known as the common council. It consists of nine members: an alderman-at-large, who acts as president of the council, and eight members elected from wards. Each of the city's four wards elects two members. The mayor and the president of the common council are each elected at-large for four-year terms. The other council members have two-year terms. Terms of office begin on January 1.

A fire chief and three assistants are elected every three years by members of the city's engine companies. A corporation counsel, commissioners of public works and of assessment and taxation, a city clerk, registrar and a treasurer and any other officers required are appointed annually by the mayor and confirmed by the common council.

Education

In the past 10 years, the Middletown public school system has changed from maintaining numerous small neighborhood schools and combined more students into fewer magnet schools. Three elementary schools cover  grade levels from kindergarten to fifth grade. Both Truman Moon Elementary School and  John W. Chorley Elementary School have made way for Presidential Park Elementary School, the district's newest school, built in 2014. William A. Carter Elementary and Maple Hill Elementary are the district's two other elementary schools. In 2005, the Middletown School District implemented a full day kindergarten program at the request of the Middletown voters. Two middle schools in the district, Twin Towers Middle School and Monhagen Middle School, collect the students from the elementary schools. Middletown High School is the only building for high school and includes grades nine to twelve. There is also a Catholic elementary school, Our Lady of Mt. Carmel.

SUNY Orange, previously known as Orange County Community College, is located in Middletown. Its campus includes the historic Webb Horton House (pictured), more commonly known as Morrison Hall. It also has a campus in Newburgh, and three satellite campuses, but the majority of buildings and students are in Middletown. A total of more than 6100 students attend SUNY Orange. In addition to credit classes, there are a wide variety of classes for lifelong learning.

Touro College of Osteopathic Medicine opened a Middletown Campus, in 2014, located in the former Horton Hospital.

Surrounding area

 Circleville
 Goshen, the county seat
 Monroe
 Newburgh
 Otisville
 Pine Bush
 Port Jervis
 Slate Hill
 Town of Crawford
 Town of Greenville
 Town of Hamptonburgh
 Town of Mamakating
 Town of Montgomery
 Town of Mount Hope
 Town of Wawayanda
 Town of Wallkill

Communities and locations adjacent to Middletown

The following communities and places are all located adjacent to, or within a few miles of Middletown:
 Crystal Run – A hamlet east of Middletown, near Interstate 84 at County Road 83.
 Fair Oaks – A hamlet north of Middletown on NY Route 17M.
 Howells – A hamlet northwest of Middletown.
 Mechanicstown – A hamlet bordering Middletown to its southeast.
 Michigan Corners – A hamlet east of Middletown on Route 211.
 Phillipsburg – A hamlet southeast of Middletown on the Wallkill River and Route 17M.
 Pilgrim Corners – A hamlet bordering Middletown to its west on Route 211.
 Rockville – A hamlet north of Middletown.
 Scotchtown – A hamlet northeast of Middletown, just across Route 17 on Route 101.
 Van Burenville – A village to the north of Middletown near Mount Hope.
 Town of Wallkill – The township that nearly surrounds Middletown, most of which is located to the north and east of Middletown.
 Washington Heights – A hamlet bordering Middletown to its north.

Media
WALL 1340 AM has been on-the-air since 1942.

Notable people

 Mike Avilés, shortstop for the Miami Marlins
 George M. Beakes, surgeon, physician
 Samuel Beakes, congressman
 Alan Berkman, physician, activist
 Bartley Campbell, playwright
 Little Sammy Davis, blues singer-songwriter
 Ed Diana, county executive, educator
 Rafael Díez de la Cortina y Olaeta, linguist
 Cleanthony Early, a former basketball player for the New York Knicks
 Linda Fite, writer
 Benjamin A. Gilman, congressman
 Loren Grey, author
 Lydia Sayer Hasbrouck, women's dress reformer
 Angelo Ingrassia, New York Supreme Court judge
 Michael Jantze, writer
 Gerald Kersh, writer
 Cage Kennylz, rapper
 Edward M. Madden, New York State Senate
 Paul B. Malone, Army Major general
 Scooter McCrae, film director

 Howard Mills III, politician
 Matt Morris, baseball pitcher 
 William Murray, congressman
 Willi Ninja, dancer and choreographer
 Susan Beth Pfeffer, children's book author
 Mike Remlinger, baseball pitcher
 Joe Romm, author, energy and climate expert, editor
 Jerry Sands, baseball player
 Cordell Schachter, chief technology officer of the New York City Dept. of Transportation
 Bill Schindler, race car driver
 Kurt Seligmann, painter
 Frank Shorter, 1972 (Gold) and 1976 (Silver) Olympic marathon medalist
 Silas Stringham, admiral
 Dave Telgheder, baseball pitcher 
 Launt Thompson, sculptor
 Spencer Tunick, artist
 Aaron Tveit, Broadway, TV and film actor and singer 
 Jimmy Weinert, former motocross national champion

References

External links

 Middletown official website
 Thrall Library website
 (New York) Ontario & Western Railway Historical Society, Inc.
  Middletown & New Jersey Railway Historical Society
 Epodunk profile

Cities in New York (state)
 
Poughkeepsie–Newburgh–Middletown metropolitan area
Cities in Orange County, New York
Cities in the New York metropolitan area